Anna Valeryevna Arkhipova (born 27 July 1973 in Stavropol) is a Russian basketball player who competed for the Russian National Team at the 2004 Summer Olympics, winning the bronze medal.

External links

References

1973 births
Living people
Sportspeople from Stavropol
Russian women's basketball players
Basketball players at the 2000 Summer Olympics
Basketball players at the 2004 Summer Olympics
Olympic bronze medalists for Russia
Olympic basketball players of Russia
Olympic medalists in basketball
Medalists at the 2004 Summer Olympics